Asclepias connivens is a species of milkweed, commonly called Baldwin's milkweed or the largeflower milkweed. It is an obligate wetland species, native to the southeastern United States (Alabama, Georgia, Florida).

It was first identified in 1817 by American botanist, William Baldwin. The name connivens refers to the conniving (converging) hoods over the stigma. The plant produces  greenish-yellow flowers, blooming between July and August and  seed bearing follicles from mature fruit. The plant dies back to the ground in winter.

References

External links
 

connivens
Flora of Alabama
Flora of Georgia (U.S. state)
Flora of Florida